Morgan Jones  (20 December 1829 – 2 June 1905) was a Welsh first-class cricketer.

The son of The Reverend John Jones, he was born in December 1829 at Llandygwydd, Cardiganshire. He was educated at Harrow School, matriculating at University College, Oxford in 1848. While studying at Oxford, he played first-class cricket for Oxford University on two occasions against Cambridge University in The University Matches of 1849 and 1850. In the 1850 fixture, he claimed a five wicket haul with six wickets in the Cambridge first-innings. Jones later served as a deputy lieutenant of Pembrokeshire in 1852 and of Cardiganshire in 1853. He served as High Sheriff of Cardiganshire the in 1854. Jones died in June 1905 at Llanmiloe, Carmarthenshire.

References

External links

1829 births
1905 deaths
Sportspeople from Ceredigion
People educated at Harrow School
Alumni of University College, Oxford
Welsh cricketers
Oxford University cricketers
Deputy Lieutenants of Pembrokeshire
Deputy Lieutenants of Cardiganshire
High Sheriffs of Cardiganshire
English cricketers of 1826 to 1863